The Karasburg tree skink (Trachylepis sparsa) is a species of skink found in Namibia, South Africa, and Botswana.

References

Trachylepis
Reptiles described in 1954
Taxa named by Robert Mertens